David Glencross Slimmon  (2 August 1895 – 23 July 1917) was a Scottish footballer who played in the Scottish League for Dumbarton and Kilmarnock as a left back.

Personal life 
Slimmon served as a second corporal in the Royal Engineers during the First World War. He was awarded the Military Medal in 1916 for "gallantry and bravery in blowing up six German dugouts". Slimmon was killed by shellfire in the Ypres Salient on 23 July 1917 and was buried in Hop Store Cemetery, Vlamertinge.

Career statistics

References

1895 births
1917 deaths
Scottish footballers
Dumbarton F.C. players
Scottish Football League players
Kilmarnock F.C. players
British Army personnel of World War I
Association football fullbacks
British military personnel killed in World War I
Royal Engineers soldiers
Recipients of the Military Medal
Footballers from Kilmarnock
St Andrews United F.C. players
Auchinleck Talbot F.C. players